The Battle of Niš (early November, 1443) saw Crusaders led by John Hunyadi and Đurađ Branković capture the Ottoman stronghold of Niš in Serbia, and defeat three armies of the Ottoman Empire. The Battle of Niš was part of Hunyadi's expedition known as the long campaign. Hunyadi, at the head of the vanguard, crossed the Balkans through the Gate of Trajan, captured Niš, defeated three Ottoman pashas, and after taking Sofia from the Ottomans, united with the royal army and defeated Sultan Murad II at Snaim (Kustinitza). The impatience of the king and the severity of the winter then compelled him (in February 1444) to return home.

Background
In 1440 John Hunyadi became the trusted adviser and most highly regarded soldier of king Władysław III of Poland. Hunyadi was rewarded with the captaincy of the fortress of Belgrade and was put in charge of military operations against the Ottomans. King Władysław recognized Hunyadi's merits by granting him estates in Eastern Hungary. Hunyadi soon showed and displayed an extraordinary capacity to marshal his defences with the limited resources at his disposal. He was victorious in Semendria over Isak-Beg in 1441. Not far from Nagyszeben in Transylvania he annihilated an Ottoman force and recovered for Hungary the suzerainty of Wallachia. The Crusader army consisted of 25,000 or more troops and 600 war wagons. Hunyadi took 12,000 cavalry to locate and defeat Kasim Pasha. Władysław and Brankovic were left in camp with the war wagons.

Battle 
The battle for Niš was not one, but five different battles. The first engagement was a battle against a small garrison in Niš and the Crusaders captured, pillaged, and burned the town. This was followed by three battles against three different Ottoman armies advancing on Niš. Finally there was one against the remnants of the three Ottoman armies.

The last battle took place on the plain between Bolvani and Niš on 3 November 1443. Ottoman forces were led by Kasim Pasha, the beglerbeg of Rumelia, Turakhan Beg and Isak-Beg. After the Ottoman defeat, the retreating forces of Kasim Pasha and Turakhan Beg burned all of the villages between Niš and Sofia. The Ottoman sources explain the Ottoman defeat as due to a lack of cooperation between the different Ottoman armies which were led by different commanders.

Aftermath 

According to Chalcocondyles, "Weary after Hunyadi forced the Ottomans to retreat in the Balkans in 1443, the old lords hurried on all sides to regain possession of their fathers' fields". One of them was Gjergj Kastrioti Skanderbeg who deserted the Ottoman army along with his nephew Hamza Kastrioti and 300 loyal Albanians and after capturing Krujë started a twenty-five-year-long struggle against the Ottoman Empire.

Murad II signed a treaty for ten years, and abdicated in favour of his son Mehmed II. When the peace was broken the next year, Murad returned to the Balkans and won the Battle of Varna in November 1444.

Citations

References

Further reading 
 

Battles involving Serbia in the Middle Ages
Battles involving Hungary
Battles involving the Ottoman Empire
Battle of Nish (1443)
1443 in the Ottoman Empire
Conflicts in 1443
1443 in Europe